Hygrocybe reesiae is a mushroom of the waxcap genus Hygrocybe. It is pink or lilac in colour, and generally grows in moist, shady conditions. A rare species, it is only found near Sydney and Tasmania. It was described in 1997 by mycologist Anthony M. Young.

External links

References

Fungi described in 1997
Fungi of Australia
reesiae